Bachang was a state constituency in Malacca, Malaysia, that has been represented in the Melaka State Legislative Assembly.

The state constituency was first contested in 1995 and is mandated to return a single Assemblyman to the Melaka State Legislative Assembly under the first-past-the-post voting system.

History

Results 
The electoral results for the Bachang state constituency in 2004, 2008 and 2013 are as follows.

References 

Malacca state constituencies
Defunct Malacca state constituencies